Charles Frederick Penson (born December 1, 1942) is a Canadian former politician. Penson was a member of the Conservative Party of Canada in the House of Commons of Canada, representing the riding of Peace River from 1993 to 2005.  He has also been a member of the Canadian Alliance (2000–2003) and the Reform Party of Canada (1993–2000). Penson is a former farmer and grain grower. During his time in the House, Penson served as official opposition critic of International Trade and also of Industry and Finance.

Penson was born in Grande Prairie, Alberta.

References

External links

1942 births
Canadian Alliance MPs
Conservative Party of Canada MPs
Living people
Members of the House of Commons of Canada from Alberta
People from Grande Prairie
Reform Party of Canada MPs
21st-century Canadian politicians